Count of Périgord (Fr.: comte de Périgord) is a noble title in the peerage of France. Originally known as "The sovereign house of the Counts of Périgord, princes by the grace of God". The first recorded sovereign Count was Emenon, who was also Count of Poitiers and Count of Angoulême. Most likely, the title was bestowed on Emenon in 845 by Pepin I of Aquitaine as a reward for Emenon fighting with Pepin against Louis the Pious. The title takes its name from the Périgord region of France, and the historic seat of the Counts of Périgord was Périgueux.

List of Counts of Périgord

House of Guilhelmides, 845–866

House of Taillefer, 866–975

House of Charroux, 975–1072

House of Talleyrand, 1072–1399

In 1399, Charles VI of France deprived the last Count of Périgord of his lands. In 1400, the king granted the title to his supporter, Louis I, Duke of Orléans.

House of Orléans, 1400–1437

In 1437, Charles, Duke of Orléans sold the title of "Count of Périgord" to John I, Count of Penthièvre.

House of Châtillon, 1437–1481

Frances married Alain I of Albret and the title of "Count of Périgord" was inherited by their son, John III of Navarre.

House of Albret, 1481–1572

House of Bourbon, 1572–1604

Catherine de Bourbon was the last individual to hold the title of Count or Countess of Périgord; she died childless.

References

 This page is based on this page on French Wikipedia.

Perigord
House of Taillefer
House of Orléans
House of Albret
House of Bourbon